Berneuil-en-Bray (literally Berneuil in Bray) is a commune in the Oise department in northern France.

Population

See also
 Communes of the Oise department

References

Communes of Oise